Gregor William Yeates, publishing as GW Yeates (19 May 1944 – 6 August 2012), was a New Zealand soil zoologist and ecologist. He was "considered the world's leading authority in soil nematode ecology, a subject of economic and ecological importance."

Scientific career and contributions
Yeates's PhD (under Wally Clark) was on nematodes of dune sands, and was completed in 1968 at the University of Canterbury. His DSc, also at the University of Canterbury.

He spent most of his working life at Soil Bureau, a division of DSIR, which became Landcare Research. He published over 200 papers and described over 100 species in genera including Longidorus, Xiphinema, Hemicycliophora, Trischistoma and Dorylaimida.

Holotypes of Yeates's are the earliest in the National Nematode Collection of New Zealand.

As a student he counted  Adelie Penguins st Cape Royds 1964–65 and 1965–66.

Yeates's early work on nematodes in sand dunes represented some of the first detailed work on nematodes in non-agricultural settings, and 'representing some of the most detailed assessments of nematode communities ever conducted in natural environments.'

He was awarded a Nuffield Foundation Commonwealth Travelling Fellowship to study at Rothamsted in 1977–1978.

He conducted long-term work on CO2 enrichment in pasture.

He studied the New Zealand flatworm Arthurdendyus triangulatus in its native environment, supporting work in the United Kingdom where it became established as an invasive pest.

Family and civic life
Yeates was the son of Massey founding staff member John Stuart Yeates. He and wife Judy lived in Upper Hutt and Palmerston North, with two children. He was elected to the Rimutaka ward of the Upper Hutt City Council (1973–1977) and the Hutt Valley Drainage Board (1973–1977). He was later involved with Te Manawa in Palmerston North and the Royal Society of New Zealand at both a local and a national level.

Honours and offices
 Nuffield Travelling Scholarship (1977)
 Fellow of the Royal Society of New Zealand (1998)
 Fellow of the New Zealand Society of Soil Science (1995)
 Fellow of the Society of Nematologists (2007)
 Editorial Board of Journal of Nematology.
 Office holder in the Royal Society of New Zealand Manawatu Branch
 Officeholder in the Royal Society of New Zealand Wellington Branch from 1981, including 1987–88
 Upper Hutt City Councillor and Hutt Valley Drainage Board member from 1973 to 1977
  Council of the New Zealand Rhododendron Association 1997–2000
 Heritage Park Rhododendron Charitable Trust Trustee
 President of the New Zealand Society of Parasitology during 1990–1991

Publications
Feeding Habits in Soil Nematode Families and Genera—An Outline for Soil Ecologists by G. W. Yeates, T. Bongers, R. G. M. De Goede, D. W. Freckman, and S. S. Georgieva in J Nematol. 1993 September; 25(3) has 901 citations according to google scholar. The paper is a study in the ecological role of nematodes structured by taxa.
Gregor Yeates.  Earthworms, Te Ara: The Encyclopedia of New Zealand, updated 27-Sep-11
Plains' Science: Inventions, Innovations and Discoveries from the Manawatu v1. (2011), co-edited by Vince Neall and Gregor Yeates, Royal Society of New Zealand Manawatu Branch and the Science Centre Inc., .

References

External links
 G W Yeates on Wikispecies

People from Palmerston North
University of Canterbury alumni
New Zealand taxonomists
2012 deaths
New Zealand biologists
Fellows of the Royal Society of New Zealand
1944 births
Nematologists
People educated at Palmerston North Boys' High School
People associated with Department of Scientific and Industrial Research (New Zealand)
20th-century New Zealand scientists
21st-century New Zealand scientists